Oleśnica is a town in Lower Silesian Voivodeship (south-west Poland).

Oleśnica may also refer to:

Oleśnica, Poddębice County in Łódź Voivodeship (central Poland)
Oleśnica, Wieluń County in Łódź Voivodeship (central Poland)
Oleśnica, Lesser Poland Voivodeship (south Poland)
Oleśnica, Świętokrzyskie Voivodeship (south-central Poland)
Oleśnica, Masovian Voivodeship (east-central Poland)
Oleśnica, Chodzież County in Greater Poland Voivodeship (west-central Poland)
Oleśnica, Słupca County in Greater Poland Voivodeship (west-central Poland)